Colegio Ingles Internacional Highland Prince Academy de Mexico, A.C. is a group of schools located in the borough of Playas de Tijuana, in Tijuana, Mexico.
It consists of four schools:
 HPA Jardin de niños
 HPA Primaria
 HPA Secundaria
 HPA Preparatoria

The HPA group is one of the oldest schools of the city of Tijuana, founded in 1971.

Government 
Only HPA Junior High & High School have their own Sociedad de Alumnos de HPA Mexico (Spanish for Associated students' union) and Sociedad de Padres de HPA Mexico (Spanish for Associated Parents Body). HPA Kindergarten & Elementary schools have only the Associated Parents body. 
The school divides its administration into several branches and levels. It is divided in three main branches: School (Principals, teachers, etc.), Students (Sociedad de Alumnos de HPA Mexico), and Parents (Sociedad de Padres de HPA).
Proximamente Universidad.

School 
The School branch divides itself into several levels and sublevels:
 Academic: Academic Principal Office, Academic Management Department (Teachers)
 Disciplinary: Prefectura (Disciplinary department)
 Administrative: Administrative Principal Office (all matters related to businesses and finances), Accountant Department (Finances) 
 New Soccer Court in the roof.
 Free iPads for newcomers.

Students
The Students branch is organized into the Sociedad de Alumnos de HPA Mexico, which divides itself into several levels:
 Presidency of the Sociedad de Alumnos
 Vicepresidency
 Treasury

Parents 
The Parents branch is somewhat similar to that of the students, but with much larger participation at social events. It has the same structure as the Students branch.

External links 

  School Site

Education in Tijuana
Schools in Mexico